Numa Denis Fustel de Coulanges (18 March 1830 – 12 September 1889) was a French historian. Joseph M. McCarthy argues that his first great book, The Ancient City (1864), was based on his in-depth knowledge of the primary Greek and Latin texts. The book argued that:
Religion was the sole factor in the evolution of ancient Greece and Rome, the bonding of family and state was the work of religion, that because of ancestor worship the family, drawn together by the need to engage in the ancestral cults, became the basic unit of ancient societies, expanding to the gens, the Greek phratry, the Roman tribe, to the patrician city state, and that decline in religious belief and authority in the moral crisis provoked by Roman wealth and expansion doomed the republic and resulted in the triumph of Christianity and the death of the ancient city-state.

Biography

Youth
Born in Paris, of Breton descent, after studying at the École Normale Supérieure he was sent to the French School at Athens.

Career
In 1853, he directed some excavations in Chios, and wrote an historical account of the island.

After his return he filled various educational offices, and took his doctorate with two theses, Quid Vestae cultus in institutis veterum privatis publicisque valuerit and Polybe, ou la Grèce conquise par les Romains (1858). In these works his distinctive qualities were already revealed. His minute knowledge of the language of the Greek and Roman institutions, coupled with his low estimation of the conclusions of contemporary scholars, led him to go directly to the original texts, which he read without political or religious bias. When, however, he had succeeded in extracting from the sources a general idea that seemed to him clear and simple, he attached himself to it as if to the truth itself.

From 1860 to 1870 he was a professor of history at the faculty of letters at Strasbourg, where he had a brilliant career as a teacher, but never yielded to the influence exercised by the German universities in the field of classical and Germanic antiquities.

The Ancient City 
It was at Strasbourg that he published La Cité antique (1864), in which he showed the part played by religion in the political and social evolution of Greece and Rome. The book was so consistent throughout, so full of ingenious ideas, and written in so striking a style, that it ranks as one of the masterpieces of the French language in the 19th century. By this literary merit, Fustel set little store, but he clung tenaciously to his theories. When he revised the book in 1875, his modifications were very slight, and it is conceivable that, had he recast it, as he often expressed the desire to do in the last years of his life, he would not have abandoned any part of his fundamental thesis.

Direction of the École normale supérieure and first chair of medieval history at the Sorbonne 
Fustel de Coulanges was appointed to a lectureship at the École Normale Supérieure in February 1870, to a professorship at the Paris faculty of letters in 1875, and to the chair of medieval history created for him at the Sorbonne in 1878, he applied himself to the study of the political institutions of ancient France. The invasion of France by the German armies during the Franco-Prussian War attracted his attention to the Germanic invasions under the Roman Empire. Pursuing the theory of J.-B. Dubos, but also transforming it, he maintained that those invasions were not marked by the violent and destructive character usually attributed to them; that the penetration of the German barbarians into Gaul was a slow process; that the Germans submitted to the imperial administration; that the political institutions of the Merovingians had their origins in the Roman laws at least as much as, if not more than, in German usages; and, consequently, that there was no conquest of Gaul by the Germans.

This thesis he sustained in his Histoire des institutions politiques de l'ancienne France, the first volume of which appeared in 1874. It was the author's original intention to complete this work in four volumes, but as the first volume was keenly attacked in Germany as well as in France, Fustel was forced in self-defense to recast the book entirely. He re-examined all the texts and wrote a number of dissertations, which were dominated by his general idea and characterised by a total disregard for the results of such historical disciplines as diplomatic. From this crucible issued an entirely new work, less well arranged than the original, but rich in facts and critical comments. The first volume was expanded into three volumes, La Gaule romaine (1891), L'Invasion germanique et la fin de l'empire (1891) and La Monarchie franque (1888), followed by three other volumes, L'Alleu et le domaine rural pendant l'époque mérovingienne (1889), Les Origines du système féodal: le bénéfice et le patronat ... (1890) and Les Transformations de la royauté pendant l'époque carolingienne (1892).

Thus, in six volumes, he had carried the work no farther than the Carolingian period. The dissertations not embodied in his work were collected by himself and (after his death) by his pupil, Camille Jullian, and published as volumes of miscellanies: Recherches sur quelques problèmes d'Histoire (1885), dealing with the Roman colonate, the land system in Normandy; the Germanic mark, and the judiciary organization in the kingdom of the Franks; Nouvelles recherches sur quelques problèmes d'histoire (1891); and Questions historiques (1893), which contains his paper on Chios and his thesis on Polybius.

His life was devoted almost entirely to his teaching and his books. In 1875, he was elected member of the Académie des Sciences Morales et Politiques, and in 1880 reluctantly accepted the post of director of the École Normale. Without intervening personally in French politics, he took a keen interest in the questions of administration and social reorganization arising from the fall of the imperialist régime and the disasters of the war.

He wished the institutions of the present to approximate more closely to those of the past and devised for the new French constitution a body of reforms which reflected the opinions he had formed upon the democracy at Rome and in ancient France. But these were dreams which did not hold him long, and he would have been scandalised had he known that his name was subsequently used as the emblem of a political and religious party. He died at Massy (then called Seine-et-Oise) in 1889.

Throughout his historical career — at the École Normale and the Sorbonne and in his lectures delivered to the empress Eugénie — his sole aim was to ascertain the truth, and in the defence of truth his polemics against what he imagined to be the blindness and insincerity of his critics sometimes assumed a character of harshness and injustice. But, in France at least, these critics were the first to render justice to his learning, his talents and his disinterestedness.

Works
 Mémoire sur l'île de Chio, Paris, 1856.
 Quid Vestæ Cultus in Institutis Veterum Privatis Publicisque Valuerit?, T. Jeunet, 1858.
 Polybe ou la Grèce Conquise par les Romains, T. Jeunet, 1858.
 La Cité Antique, Durand, 1864.
 Histoire des Institutions Politiques de l'Ancienne France:
 La Gaule Romaine.
 L'Invasion Germanique et la Fin de l'Empire.
 La Monarchie Franque.
 L'Alleu et le Domaine Rural pendant l'Époque Mérovingienne.
 Les Origines du Système Féodal.
 Les Transformations de la Royauté pendant l'Époque Carolingienne.
 Recherches sur Quelques Problèmes d'Histoire, Paris, Hachette, 1885.
 Nouvelles Recherches sur Quelques Problèmes d'Histoire, Hachette, 1891.
 Questions Historiques, Hachette, 1893.
 Questions Contemporaines, Hachette, 1917 [1st Pub. 1916].
 Leçons à l'Impératrice sur les Origines de la Civilisation Française, Hachette, 1930.

Works in English translation
The Ancient City: A Study on the Religion, Laws, and Institutions of Greece and Rome, Imperium Press, 2020. 
 The Ancient City: A Study on the Religion, Laws and Institutions of Greece and Rome, Lee & Shepard, 1877.
 The Origin of Property in Land, Sonnenschein, 1891.

Historiography
 Les communaux et le domaine à l'époque franque : réponse à m. Fustel de Coulanges, Glasson, Ernest-Désiré; Paris: F. Pichon, 1890.
 Numa-Denis Fustel de Coulanges, Ledos, Eugène-Gabriel; Paris : Revue des Questions historiques, 1890.
 Fustel de Coulanges, Guiraud, Paul; Paris: Hachette, 1896.
 Fustel de Coulanges, Labelle, Eugène; Paris: Bloud, 1913.
 L'histoire des institutions politiques de Fustel de Coulanges, Lazare de Gérin, Richard; Paris: Société française d'éditions littéraires et techniques, E. Malfère, 1936.
 The historical thought of Fustel de Coulanges, Herrick, Jane; Washington, Catholic University of America Press, 1954.
 Le XIXe siècle et l'histoire : le cas Fustel de Coulanges, Hartog, François; Paris: Seuil, 2001.

See also
 Quia Emptores

References

Citations

Sources

Further reading
 DiVanna, Isabel. Writing History in the Third Republic, Cambridge Scholars Publishing, 2010.  excerpt and text search
 Fisher, H. A. L. "Fustel de Coulanges," The English Historical Review, Vol. V, 1890.
 Herrick, Jane. The Historical thought of Fustel de Coulanges, Catholic University of America, 1954.
 Momigliano, Arnaldo. "La Cité Antique de Fustel de Coulanges." In Problèmes d'Historiographie Ancienne et Moderne, Gallimard, 1983.
 Hartog, François. Le XIXème Siècle et l'Histoire. Le Cas Fustel de Coulanges, Presses Universitaires de France, 1988.

External links

 
 

1830 births
1889 deaths
Writers from Paris
Academic staff of the University of Strasbourg
Academic staff of the University of Paris
École Normale Supérieure alumni
Academic staff of the École Normale Supérieure
Members of the Académie des sciences morales et politiques
French medievalists
Historians of antiquity
Members of the French School at Athens
19th-century French historians